Greater Israel Movement can refer to either of the following:
Movement for Greater Israel - a political organisation in Israel during the 1960s and 1970s which subscribed to an ideology of Greater Israel. 
Greater Israel - an expression, with several different Biblical and political meanings over time. It is often used, in an irredentist fashion, to refer to the historic or desired borders of Israel.